Driftwood is a 2006 horror film that was shown at the Screamfest LA International Horror Film Festival on October 20, 2006. The film was released on DVD on November 13, 2007. Driftwood was directed by Tim Sullivan and starring Raviv Ullman and Diamond Dallas Page.

Plot
Riddled with guilt over the loss of his rock star older brother, 16-year-old David Forrester (Ricky Ullman) becomes obsessed with death, leading his misguided parents to send him to Driftwood, an "Attitude Adjustment Camp for Troubled Youths" run by the sadistic Captain Doug Kennedy (Diamond Dallas Page) and his brutal young henchman, Yates (Talan Torriero). Once there, David becomes haunted by the spirit of Jonathan (Connor Ross), a former inmate who met a mysterious end; a mystery whose resolution could very well be David's only way out.

Cast 
Raviv Ullman as David Forrester
Diamond Dallas Page as Captain Doug Kennedy
Talan Torriero as Yates
David Eigenberg as Norris
Jeremy Lelliott as Noah
Baelyn Neff as Myra
Frankie Levangie as Boyle
Connor Ross as Jonathan
Cory Hardrict as Darryl
David Skyler as K.C.
Shahine Ezell as Cobey
John Walcutt as Quails
Lou Beatty, Jr. as Doc
Kim Morgan Greene as Mrs. Sherman
Russell Sams as Dean Forrester
Lin Shaye as Nancy Forrester
Marc McClure as Rich Forrester

References

External links 
 
 

2006 films
American horror films
2006 horror films
Dark Horse Entertainment films
Films scored by William Ross
2000s English-language films
Films directed by Tim Sullivan
2000s American films